Lesbian, gay, bisexual, and transgender (LGBT) persons in Armenia face legal and social challenges not experienced by non-LGBT residents, due in part to the lack of laws prohibiting discrimination on the grounds of sexual orientation and gender identity and in part to prevailing negative attitudes about LGBT persons throughout society.

Homosexuality has been legal in Armenia since 2003. However, even though it has been decriminalized, the situation of local lesbian, gay, bisexual, and transgender (LGBT) citizens has not changed substantially. Many LGBT Armenians fear being socially outcast by their friends and families, causing them to keep their sexual orientation or gender identity secret, except to a few family members and friends.

Homosexuality remains a taboo topic in many parts of Armenian society. In a 2012 study, 55% of correspondents in Armenian stated that they would cease their relationship with a friend or relative if they were to come out as gay. Furthermore, this study found that 70% of Armenians find LGBT people to be "strange". There is, moreover, no legal protection for LGBT persons whose human rights are frequently violated. Armenia has been ranked 47th out of 49 European countries for LGBT rights, with Turkey and neighboring Azerbaijan taking the 48th and 49th positions, respectively.

Many LGBT people say they fear violence in their workplace or from their family, and therefore, do not file complaints of human rights violations or of criminal offences. So reported incidents of discrimination, harassment or hate crimes are likely to underestimate their true rates.

In 2011, Armenia signed the "joint statement on ending acts of violence and related human rights violations based on sexual orientation and gender identity" at the United Nations, condemning violence and discrimination against LGBT people.

Legality of same-sex sexual activity
Between 1920 and 1991, Armenia was part of the Soviet Union. Until 2003, the legislation of Armenia followed the corresponding Section 121 from the former Soviet Union Penal Code, which specifically criminalized anal intercourse between men. Lesbian and non-penetrative gay sex between consenting adults was not explicitly mentioned in the law as being a criminal offence.

The specific article of the Penal Code was 116, dating back to 1936, and the maximum penalty was five years' imprisonment.

The abolition of the anti-gay law along with the death penalty was among Armenia's pre-accession conditions to the Council of Europe in 2001. In December 2002, the Azgayin Zhoghov (National Assembly) approved the new penal code in which the anti-gay article was removed. On 1 August 2003, President of Armenia Robert Kocharyan ratified it, bringing to an end the decades of repression against gay men in Armenia.

There were seven prosecutions in 1996 and four in 1997 under the law (according to Amnesty International), and four in 1999 (according to the Legal Affairs and Human Rights Committee of the Council of Europe).

In 2001, local human rights NGO "Helsinki Association" published via its website the story of a 20-year-old. In 1999, the young man was sentenced to three months of imprisonment for having sex with another man. He was the last condemned under Article 116. In his testimony, he denounced prison guard abuse and mistreatment but also the corrupt judge who shortened his sentence for a $US1,000 bribe. The mediatization or publicising of his case signalled the first gay "coming out" in Armenia.

The age of consent is 16, regardless of gender and sexual orientation.

Recognition of same-sex relationships

Same-sex marriage and civil unions are not legal in Armenia and the Constitution limits marriage to opposite-sex couples.

In late 2017, Father Vazken Movsesian of the Armenian Apostolic Church, a high-ranking member of the clergy, expressed his personal support for same-sex marriage, becoming one of the most high-profile supporters of same-sex marriage in Armenia. In an interview with Equality Armenia, Movsesian likened the historic persecution of Armenians by Turkey to the persecution faced by LGBT people. "We've been persecuted because we were not accepted, because we were different. As an Armenian Christian, how can I possibly close my eyes to what's going on in the world? And it's not just in Armenia, just everywhere, this intolerance", he said. Other supporters include organisation Equality Armenia, whose goal is "achieving marriage equality in Armenia".

In November 2018, the Armenian Government rejected a bill proposed by MP Tigran Urikhanyan to introduce further prohibitions on same-sex marriage.

On 26 August 2019, the Minister of Justice, Rustam Badasyan, stated that Armenia does not recognize same-sex marriage.

Discrimination protections
Even though Armenia was one of the first nations in the region to endorse the UN declaration on sexual orientation and gender identity in December 2008, as of 2022, there is no legislation protecting LGBT persons from discrimination. A 2011 survey showed that 50% of people in Armenia would "walk away indifferently" if they were witnessing violence against an LGBT person, highlighting the strongly-embedded cultural belief against homosexuality.

ILGA-Europe conducts activities related to advancing LGBT rights in Armenia through seven NGO's and civil societies based in Armenia.

Military service
According to the Helsinki Rights Committee in Armenia, in 2004, an internal defence ministry decree effectively bans gay men from serving in the armed forces. In practice, gays are marked as "mentally ill" and sent to a psychiatrist.

Living conditions

Violence and homophobia
In the fall of 2004, prompted by the announcement of Armen Avetisyan, founder of AAU (Armenian Aryan Union), an extreme right group, that some Armenian top officials were gay, various parliament members initiated heated debates that were broadcast over the public TV channel. Members of Parliament stated that any member found to be gay should resign – an opinion shared by the Presidential Advisor for National Security, Garnik Isagulyan.

In May 2012, suspected "Neo-Nazis" launched two arson attacks at a lesbian-owned pub in Armenia's capital, Yerevan. Armenian News reported that in the second attack on 15 May, a group of young men arrived at the gay DIY Rock Pub around 6pm, where they burned the bar's "No to Fascism" poster and drew the Nazi Swastika on the walls. This followed another attack on 8 May in which a petrol bomb was thrown through the Rock Pub's window.

In May 2018, while in Armenia on a humanitarian mission, Elton John was subjected to homophobic slurs and eggs were hurled at him. The suspect was later released by the police.

In August 2018, nine LGBT activists were violently attacked by a mob at a private home in the town of Shurnukh, sending two of them to hospital for serious injuries. The violent attack received widespread media coverage, and was condemned by human rights groups and the U.S. embassy. The attackers were later released by the police.

Activism

Following the abolition of the anti-gay law, some sporadic signs of an emerging LGBT rights movement were observed in Armenia. In October 2003, a group of 15 LGBT people gathered in Yerevan to set up an organization which was initially baptised GLAG (Gay and Lesbian Armenian Group). But after several meetings, the participants failed to achieve their goal.

In 1998, the Armenian Gay and Lesbian Association of New York was founded to support LGBT diasporan Armenians. A similar group was also established in France.

In 2007, Pink Armenia, another NGO, emerged to promote public awareness on HIV and other STI (sexually transmitted infections) prevention but also to fight discrimination on the basis of sexual orientation. Pink conducts research on the status of LGBT people in Armenia, while working with other NGOs to combat homophobia.

Other LGBT groups include the Gay and Lesbian Armenian Society (GALAS), the Armenia Rainbow Initiative, and Equality Armenia, which is based in Los Angeles, United States.

On 5 April 2019, a transgender woman, Lilit Martirosyan, took the floor at the National Assembly of Armenia and talked about the hopes for a better and more secure future for the LGBT community in Armenia. Her speech marked the first time in the history of Armenia that a transgender person had spoken in the National Assembly. She described herself as "the embodiment of a tortured, raped, kidnapped, physically assaulted, burnt, murdered, robbed and unemployed Armenian transgender." Her speech faced a lot of backlash, specifically MP Naira Zohrabyan who quit the National Assembly during the speech and threats from MP Vartan Ghukasian to have her burnt alive.

Freedom of speech and expression
In 2013, the Armenian police proposed a bill outlawing "non-traditional sexual relationships" and the promotion of LGBT "propaganda" to youth in a law similar to the Russian anti-gay law. Ashot Aharonian, a police spokesperson, stated that the bill was proposed due to the public's fear of the spreading of homosexuality. However, NGOs including Pink Armenia claimed that this was an attempt to distract the public from various sociopolitical issues within the country. The bill ultimately failed to pass.

In November 2018, a Christian LGBT group had to cancel several forums and events it had planned due to "constant threats" and "organized intimidation" from political and religious leaders, as well as a "lack of sufficient readiness" from the police force to protect them.

Iravunk newspaper incident
On 17 May 2014, the Iravunk newspaper published an article with a list of dozens of people's Facebook accounts from the Armenian LGBT community, calling them "zombies" and accused them of serving the interest of the international homosexual lobby. The newspaper was sued and taken before the Armenian Court of Appeals, where the judges found that the newspaper did not offend anybody and ordered the plaintiffs to pay 50,000 dram (US$120) as compensation to the newspaper and its editor, Hovhannes Galajyan.

Human rights reports

2017 United States Department of State report
In 2017, the United States Department of State reported the following, concerning the status of LGBT rights in Armenia:

"The most significant human rights issues included: torture; harsh and life threatening prison conditions; arbitrary arrest and detention; lack of judicial independence; failure to provide fair trials; violence against journalists; interference in freedom of the media, using government legal authority to penalize critical content; physical interference by security forces with freedom of assembly; restrictions on political participation; systemic government corruption; failure to protect lesbian, gay, bisexual, transgender, and intersex (LGBTI) persons from violence; and worst forms of child labor, which the government made minimal efforts to eliminate."
Prison and Detention Center Conditions"The Prison Monitoring Group noted that homosexual males, those associating with them, and inmates convicted of crimes such as rape, were segregated from other inmates and forced to perform humiliating jobs and provide sexual services."
Academic Freedom and Cultural Events"In July organizers of the Golden Apricot International Film Festival canceled the screening of two LGBTI-themed films after negative public reaction (see section 6, Acts of Violence, Discrimination, and Other Abuses Based on Sexual Orientation and Gender Identity)."
Acts of Violence, Discrimination, and Other Abuses Based on Sexual Orientation and Gender Identity"Antidiscrimination laws do not apply to sexual orientation or gender identity.  There were no hate crime laws or other criminal judicial mechanisms to aid in the prosecution of crimes against members of the LGBTI community. Societal discrimination based on sexual orientation and gender identity negatively affected all aspects of life, including employment, housing, family relations, and access to education and health care. Transgender persons were especially vulnerable to physical and psychological abuse and harassment. During the year the NGO Public Information and Need of Knowledge (PINK Armenia) documented 27 cases of alleged human rights violations against LGBTI persons, but only four victims sought help from the ombudsperson's office and none from law enforcement bodies. On 23 August, according to media reports, 30 to 35 civilian men, allegedly led by a municipality employee, attacked a group of transgender sex workers in a park near the municipality office.  Police stopped the attack and opened a criminal investigation into the incident. Lawyers from the NGO New Generation, who represented the transgender persons and the sex workers, claimed that such group attacks happened at least once a month and individual attacks happened almost daily. In most cases, police were ineffective in either preventing such cases or apprehending perpetrators. On 25 May, PINK Armenia placed three LGBTI-themed social advertising banners in downtown Yerevan.  On 27 May, the advertising company tore them down following a highly negative public reaction. Shortly after the posters were removed, an official from the Yerevan municipality announced on his Facebook page that the three banners promoting tolerance were posted illegally and without the permission of the municipality. According to PINK Armenia, the banners did not contain any material prohibited by the law, the installation was made in accordance with existing practices, and the Yerevan municipality violated the NGO's freedom of expression. After the removal of the posters, anti-LGBTI groups launched cyberattacks on PINK Armenia's website. The physical address of PINK Armenia was posted on Facebook with a message encouraging attacks on the organization. On 9 July, the Golden Apricot International Film festival opened amid controversy over the organizers' canceling the screening of several noncompetitive films, including two with LGBTI themes. One of the festival's partners, the Union of Cinematographers, demanded that the two films be removed from the program.  The festival organizers responded by canceling the screening of all noncompetitive-category films immediately before the festival's opening. According to an assessment conducted by the NGO New Generation in 2016, transgender individuals desiring to undergo sex-change procedures faced medical and other problems related to the administration of hormones without medical supervision, underground surgeries, and problems obtaining documents reflecting a change in gender identity. On 4 July, the Right Side NGO, which focuses on the transgender population, reported that a local municipal employee came to their location to harass and assault its president. In September the president reported that the organization's landlord decided not to renew their lease. Openly gay men are exempt from military service. An exemption, however, requires a medical finding based on a psychological examination indicating an individual has a mental disorder; this information appears in the individual's personal identification documents and is an obstacle to employment and obtaining a driver's license. Gay men who served in the army reportedly faced physical and psychological abuse as well as blackmail."
HIV and AIDS Social Stigma"According to human rights groups, persons regarded as vulnerable to HIV/AIDS, such as sex workers (including transgender sex workers) and drug users, faced discrimination and violence from society as well as mistreatment by police."
Discrimination with Respect to Employment and Occupation"There were no effective legal mechanisms to implement these regulations, and discrimination in employment and occupation occurred based on gender, age, presence of a disability, sexual orientation, HIV/AIDS status, and religion, even though there were no official or other statistics to account to the scale of such discrimination."

Public opinion
A 2016 study by the Heinrich Böll Foundation found that only 9% of respondents knew anyone who was LGBT and 90% agreed with the statement, "Homosexual relationships should be banned by law".

According to a June 2015-June 2016 survey by the Pew Research Center, 96% of Armenians opposed same-sex marriage, with only 3% supporting it.

In May 2017, a survey by the Pew Research Center in Eastern European countries showed that 97% of Armenians believed that homosexuality should not be accepted by society.

Summary table

See also

 Human rights in Armenia
 ILGA-Europe
 LGBT rights by country or territory
 LGBT rights in Europe
 LGBT rights in Asia
 Recognition of same-sex unions in Armenia
 Recognition of same-sex unions in Europe
 Social issues in Armenia

Notes

External links